The MTV Africa Music Awards 2014 took place on 7 June 2014, at the Durban International Convention Centre (ICC Arena). The awards aired live across Africa on MTV Base and MTV. The ceremony was sponsored by KwaZulu-Natal Province, Absolut and the City of Durban. The show was hosted by American comedian and actor Marlon Wayans. The ceremony featured performances from artists such as  Miguel, Trey Songz, Flavour N'abania, French Montana, Tiwa Savage, Davido, Mafikizolo, Uhuru, Oskido, Professor, Diamond Platnumz,  Phyno, Yuri Da Cunha, Sauti Sol, Sarkodie, Ice Prince, The Arrows, Khuli Chana, Dr SID, Fally Ipupa, Michael Lowman, Don Jazzy, DJ Clock, Beatenberg, DJ Kent, Big Nuz, Toofan, D'Banj, DJ Vigi, DJ Tira, DJ Buckz, and Burna Boy. On 27 May 2014, the nominees for the MTV Base Leadership Award were announced. On 28 May, MTV Base revealed Drake, Beyoncé, Rihanna, Pharrell Williams, and Miley Cyrus as the nominees for the Best International Act category. Davido and Mafikizolo received the most nominations with four each. Mi Casa and P-Square received three nominations. Diamond Platnumz and Wizkid were nominated twice for both Best Male and Best Collaboration. 

Marlon Wayans wore a bead-studded rickshaw, and was cheered on by the crowd. Throughout the event, he portrayed an American reporter who stereotyped African talent during staged interviews. Mafikizolo won two trophies and performed their song "Khona", alongside Flavour N'abania, Sauti Sol, and Fally Ipupa. Davido took home two awards for Artist of the Year and Best Male. Tiwa Savage toppled Efya, Chidinma, Arielle T, and DJ C’ndo for the Best Female award. Afro-soul songstress Simphiwe Dana paid tribute to the late Nelson Mandela by performing in front of a giant timelapse video artwork created by Transform Today nominee Rasty. The kidnapping of the Nigerian school girls was also addressed during the ceremony. Ladysmith Black Mambazo received great applause for performing "Acappello" and "Y-tjukutja". Lupita Nyong'o won the Personality of the Year award; a clip of her acceptance speech was aired during the ceremony. American musicians Miguel, French Montana, and Trey Songz performed their hit songs. Celebrity guests attending the event included Khloé Kardashian, D'Banj, Nomzamo Mbatha, Goldfish, DJ Fresh, John Vlismas, Kajal Bagwandeen, Emmanuel Adebayor, Wema Sepetu, Minnie Dlamini, Sizwe Dhlomo, Dorcas Shola Fapson, DJ C’ndo, Efya and Riaad Moosa.

BET International premiered the show on June 12. The show was broadcast internationally in summer 2014.

Nominations revelation
The nomination party was held at The Sands in Johannesburg. Nominations were revealed by Nomuzi Mabena, Sizwe Dhlomo, Alex Okosi, Tim Horwood, and Shirley Mabiletja.

Performers

Winners and nominees

Music categories

Best Male
Davido
Anselmo Ralph 
Diamond
Donald
Wizkid

Best Female
Tiwa Savage
Arielle T
Chidinma
DJ C’ndo
Efya

Best Group
Mafikizolo
Big Nuz
Mi Casa
P-Square
Sauti Sol

Best Video
Clarence Peters

Best New Act
Stanley Enow
Burna Boy
Heavy K 
Phyno
Uhuru

Best Live Act
Flavour
2face Idibia
Fally Ipupa
Dr Malinga
Zakes Bantwini

Best Collaboration
Uhuru (featuring DJ Buckz, Oskido, Professor, Yuri Da Cunha) - "Y-tjukutja"
Amani (featuring Radio and Weasel) - "Kiboko Changu"
Diamond (featuring Davido) - "Number One" (Remix)
Mafikizolo (featuring May D) - "Happiness" 
R2bees (featuring Wizkid) - "Slow Down"

Artist of the Year
Davido
Mafikizolo
Mi Casa
P-Square
Uhuru

Song of the Year
Mafikizolo (featuring Uhuru) - "Khona"
Davido - "Skelewu" 
DJ Clock (featuring Beatenberg) - "Pluto" (Remember Me)
DJ Ganyani (featuring FB) - "Xigubu" 
DJ Kent (featuring The Arrows) - "Spin My World Around"
Dr SID (featuring Don Jazzy) - "Surulere"
KCee - "Limpopo"
Mi Casa - "Jika"
P-Square - "Personally"
Yuri Da Cunha - "Atchu Tchu Tcha"

Best Hip Hop
Sarkodie
AKA
Ice Prince
Khuli Chana
Olamide

Best Pop
Goldfish
Danny K
Fuse ODG
LCNVL
Mathew Mole

Best Alternative
Gangs of Ballet
Michael Lowman 
Nakhane Toure
The Parlotones
Shortstraw

Best Francophone
Toofan
Arielle T
Espoir 2000
Ferre Gola
Youssoupha

Best Lusophone
Anselmo Ralph
JD
Lizha James
Nelson Freitas 
Yuri Da Cunha

Best International Act
Pharrell Williams
Drake
Beyoncé
Rihanna
Miley Cyrus

Non music categories

Personality of the Year
Lupita Nyong'o
Chimamanda Adiche
Omotola Jalade Ekeinde
Trevor Noah
Yaya Touré

Transform Today by Absolut
Clarence Peters
Anisa Mpungwe
Leti Arts
Joseph Livingstone(Jkl)
Rasty

MTV Base Leadership Award
Ashish J. Thakkar
Humphrey Nabimanya 
Ludwick Marishane 
Dr Sandile Kubheka
Toyosi Akerele

References

2014 in South Africa
2014 music awards
June 2014 events in Africa
MTV Africa Music Awards